Rogelio Farías Salvador (13 August 1949 – 6 April 1995) was a Chilean football midfielder who played for Chile in the 1974 FIFA World Cup. He also played for Unión Española.

Career
A historical player of Unión Española, he made his debut in 1968 at the age of nineteen. Following the 1974 FIFA World Cup, he moved to Spanish side Cádiz CF in the Segunda División, where he coincided with his compatriot Fernando Carvallo, and spent three seasons.

Back in Chile, he played for Unión Española, O'Higgins and Audax Italiano in the top division. In the second level, he played for Coquimbo Unido. His last club was Unión Española in 1983.

At international level, he made thirteen appearances and scored two goals for the Chile national team from 1972 to 1977, including the 1974 FIFA World Cup.

Personal life
As a player of Cádiz CF, he was known by his undiscipline. 

He died of a throat cancer.

References

External links
 FIFA profile
 Rogelio Farías at BDFutbol.com 
 Rogelio Farías at PartidosdeLaRoja.com 
 Rogelio Farías at PlaymakerStats.com

1949 births
1995 deaths
Footballers from Santiago
Chilean footballers
Chilean expatriate footballers
Chile international footballers
Association football midfielders
Chilean Primera División players
Unión Española footballers
O'Higgins F.C. footballers
Audax Italiano footballers
Segunda División players
Cádiz CF players
Primera B de Chile players
Coquimbo Unido footballers
Chilean expatriate sportspeople in Spain
Expatriate footballers in Spain
1974 FIFA World Cup players